Harry A. Englehart, Jr. (August 21, 1923 – May 1982) was a Democratic member of the Pennsylvania House of Representatives.

He died suddenly in a Pittsburgh hospital in 1982.

References

Republican Party members of the Pennsylvania House of Representatives
1923 births
1982 deaths
20th-century American politicians